Heliu is a town of Huaiyuan County in northern Anhui province, China, located on the southern (right) bank of the Guo River  north-northwest of the county seat. , it has 20 villages under its administration.

See also 
 List of township-level divisions of Anhui

References 

Towns in Anhui